In geographic information systems, a geocell (or geo-cell) is a patch on the surface of the Earth that is 1 degree of latitude by 1 degree of longitude in extent.

At the equator, a geocell is approximately a 111x square - but the east-west dimension of geocells gradually decreases and the shape of the geocell becomes increasingly trapezoidal towards the poles.

References 

Geography terminology